The British Rail BEMU was an experimental two-car battery electric multiple unit (BEMU), converted from the prototype Derby Lightweight Diesel multiple units. The train was powered by many lead-acid batteries, and was used on the Deeside Railway from Aberdeen to Ballater in Scotland from April 1958 until it was finally withdrawn in December 1966. The North of Scotland Hydro-Electric Board initiated the design and was a joint sponsor. The board promised to supply power at three farthings per unit for a fixed two-year period. It provided a 6,600 V supply to a charger at Aberdeen's platform 1 and 11 kV to a Ballater charger.

Career
The estimated cost of the fit-out was £50,000, with the two coaches accounting for almost half of that. Because each set of batteries weighed about eight tons, the underframe of the carriages needed strengthening, at a budgeted cost of £2,000. Motors, conduits and cabling were costed at £5,000.

The unit was equipped with a new type of battery in the early 1960s, but subsequently suffered a series of small fires in the battery areas and was withdrawn from service. It returned to use for a period before closure of the line in 1966.

Departmental use and preservation
The train then spent a short time in storage at Inverurie Works, and at Hyndland Shed in Glasgow, before being transferred to departmental use as test train "Gemini" (or "Laboratory 16") for use at the Railway Technical Centre, at Derby. It lasted in this role until it was withdrawn in 1984, and was eventually bought for preservation at the proposed West Yorkshire Transport Museum, where it was returned to working order. The museum placed it on loan to the East Lancashire Railway in 1994 where, after asbestos was removed and the batteries refurbished, it was used on some services until 2000. After the museum went into liquidation, the unit was purchased by the Royal Deeside Railway in 2001. It is now back in Scotland, where it is undergoing refurbishment.

Details are as follows:

References

External links
Photos at Royal Deeside Railway
Dave Coxon's website - Photographs from the unit's time as the BR Automatic Train Operation test train.
Railcar Association – BEMU

BEMU
Train-related introductions in 1958